Woodbine is an unincorporated community in York County, Pennsylvania, United States.  Until 1978, this community was served by the Maryland and Pennsylvania Railroad at milepost 50.6.

Geography
Woodbine is located at  (39.7848255, -76.4057951).

References

Unincorporated communities in York County, Pennsylvania
Unincorporated communities in Pennsylvania